Dylan Eagleson is an Irish amateur boxer. While representing the Republic of Ireland he won a silver medal at the 2022 European Championships, and while representing Northern Ireland he won a gold medal at the 2022 Commonwealth Games.

References

Living people
Year of birth missing (living people)
Date of birth missing (living people)
Male boxers from Northern Ireland
Southpaw boxers
Bantamweight boxers
Boxers at the 2022 Commonwealth Games
Commonwealth Games medallists in boxing
Commonwealth Games gold medallists for Northern Ireland
Medallists at the 2022 Commonwealth Games